The Southern Cameroons was the southern part of the British League of Nations mandate territory of the British Cameroons in West Africa. Since 1961, it has been part of the Republic of Cameroon, where it makes up the Northwest Region and Southwest Region. Since 1994, pressure groups in the territory claim there was no legal document (treaty of union) in accordance to UNGA RES 1608(XV) paragraph 5, and are seeking to restore statehood and independence from the Republic. They renamed the British Southern Cameroons as Ambazonia (from Ambas Bay).

League of Nations mandate
Following the Treaty of Versailles, the German territory of Kamerun was divided on June 28, 1919, between a French and a British League of Nations Mandate, the French, who had previously administered the whole occupied territory, getting the larger. The French mandate was known as Cameroun. The British mandate comprised two adjacent territories, Northern Cameroons and Southern Cameroons. They were administered from, but not joined to, the British territory of Nigeria through the British Resident (although some incumbents had the rank of District Officer, Senior Resident or Deputy Resident) with headquarters in Buea.

Applying the principle of indirect rule, the British allowed native authorities to administer populations according to their own traditions. These also collected taxes, which were then paid over to the British. The British devoted themselves to trade and to exploiting mining resources of the territory. South Cameroons students, including Emmanuel Mbela Lifafa Endeley, created the Cameroons Youth League (CYL) on 27 March 1940, to oppose what they saw as the exploitation of their country.

Trust territory
When the League of Nations ceased to exist in 1946, most of the mandate territories were reclassified as UN trust territories, henceforth administered through the UN Trusteeship Council. The object of trusteeship was to prepare the lands for eventual independence. The United Nations approved the Trusteeship Agreements for British Cameroons to be governed by Britain on 6 December 1946.

Southern Cameroons was divided in 1949 into two provinces: Bamenda (capital Bamenda, hence also thus named) and Southern (capital Buea). Yet the residential type of administration was continued with a single British Resident at Buea, but in 1949 Edward John Gibbons was appointed Special Resident, and on 1 October 1954, when political power shifted to the elected government, succeeded himself as first of only two commissioners.

Following the Ibadan General Conference of 1950, a new constitution for Nigeria devolved more power to the regions. In the subsequent election thirteen Southern Cameroonian representatives were elected to the Eastern Nigerian House of Assembly in Enugu. In 1953, however, the Southern Cameroons representatives, unhappy with the domineering attitude of Nigerian politicians and lack of unity among the ethnic groups in the Eastern Region, declared a "benevolent neutrality" and withdrew from the assembly. At a conference in London from 30 July to 22 August 1953, the Southern Cameroons delegation asked for a separate region of its own. The British agreed, and Southern Cameroons became an autonomous region with its capital still at Buea. Elections were held in 1954 and the parliament met on 1 October 1954, with E.M.L. Endeley as Premier. As Cameroun and Nigeria prepared for Independence, South Cameroons nationalists debated whether their best interests lay with union with Cameroun, union with Nigeria or total independence. Endeley was defeated in elections on 1 February 1959 by John Ngu Foncha.
 
Referendums were held in 1959 and 1961 in the Cameroons to determine union with Nigeria or Cameroun. In 1961, Northern Cameroons voted for union with Nigeria and Southern Cameroons for union with (the formerly French) Cameroun.

Ambazonian independence movement

Southern Cameroons became part of Cameroon on 1 October 1961. Foncha served as Prime Minister of West Cameroun and vice-president of the Federal Republic of Cameroun. However, the English-speaking peoples of the Southern Cameroons (now West Cameroun) did not believe that they were fairly treated by the French-speaking government of the country. Following a referendum on 20 May 1972, a new constitution was adopted in Cameroun which replaced the federal state with a unitary state. Southern Cameroons lost its autonomous status and became the Northwest Province and Southwest Province of the Republic of Cameroun. The Southern Cameroonians felt further marginalised. Groups such as the Cameroon Anglophone Movement (CAM) demanded greater autonomy, or independence, for the provinces.

Pro-independence groups claim that UN Resolution 1608 21 April 1961, which required the UK, the Government of the Southern Cameroons and Republic of Cameroun to engage in talks with a view to agreeing measures for union of the two countries, was not implemented, and that the Government of the United Kingdom was negligent in terminating its trusteeship without ensuring that proper arrangements were made. They say that the adoption of a federal constitution by Cameroun on 1 September 1961 constituted annexation of South Cameroons.

Representatives of Anglophone groups convened the first All Anglophone Conference (AAC1) in Buea from 2 April to 3 April 1993. The conference issued the "Buea Declaration", which called for constitutional amendments to restore the 1961 federation. This was followed by the second All Anglophone Conference (AAC2) in Bamenda in 1994. This conference issued the "Bamenda Declaration", which stated that if the federal state was not restored within a reasonable time, Southern Cameroons would declare its independence. The AAC was renamed the Southern Cameroons Peoples Conference (SCPC), and later the Southern Cameroons Peoples Organisation (SCAPO), with the Southern Cameroons National Council (SCNC) as the executive governing body. Younger activists formed the Southern Cameroons Youth League (SCYL) in Buea on 28 May 1995. The SCNC sent a delegation, led by John Foncha, to the United Nations, which was received on 1 June 1995 and presented a petition against the 'annexation' of the Southern Cameroons by French Cameroun. This was followed by a signature referendum the same year, which the organisers claim produced a 99% vote in favour of independence with 315,000 people voting.

Armed members of the SCNC took over the Buea radio station in Southwest Province on the night of 30 December 1999 and in the early hours of 31 December broadcast a tape of a proclamation of independence read by Judge Ebong Frederick Alobwede.

Amnesty International has accused the Cameroun authorities of human right violations against South Cameroons activists.

Complaint with the African Commission on Human and Peoples Rights 
On 9 January 2003, the SCNC and SCAPO filed a complaint with the African Commission on Human and Peoples' Rights against the Republic of Cameroun. Among other allegations, the complainants alleged that the Republic of Cameroun is illegally occupying the territory of Southern Cameroons. The Complainants alleged that the Republic of Cameroon has violated Articles 2, 3, 4, 5, 6, 7(1), 9, 10, 11, 12, 13, 17(1), 19, 20, 21, 22, 23(1), 24 of the African Charter. The SCNC and SCAPO ultimately seek the independence of the territory of Southern Cameroons. In a decision reached at its 45th Ordinary Session on May 27, 2009, the African Commission on Human and Peoples' Rights found that the Republic of Cameroun has violated Articles 1, 2, 4, 5, 6, 7(1), 10, 11, 19 and 26 the Charter. The Human Rights Commission determined that Articles 12, 13, 17(1), 20, 21, 22, 23(1) and 24 have not been violated.

The Human Rights Commission further recognized that under the African Charter and broad international law, Southern Cameroons meets the definition of a "people" under international law "because they manifest numerous characteristics and affinities, which include a common history, linguistic tradition, territorial connection, and political outlook". The Human Rights Commission declared itself incompetent rationae temporis, to rule on allegations that occurred prior to 18 December 1989, date on which the African Charter came into force for the Respondent State (Republic of Cameroun). Hence, the Human Rights Commission declared itself incompetent to rule on the complainants' allegations with respect to events that occurred from the 1961 United Nations plebiscite to 1972 when the Federal and Union Constitutions were adopted to form the United Republic of Cameroon during which the Complainants claim the Respondent State (Republic of Cameroun) "...established its colonial rule there, complete with its structures, and its administrative, military and police personnel, applying a system and operating in a language alien to the Southern Cameroon." The Human Rights Commission stated, however, that, if the Complainants can establish that any violation committed before 18 December 1989 continued thereafter, then the Commission shall have competence to examine it.

The Human Rights Commission addressed the question, whether the people of Southern Cameroons are entitled to the right to self-determination contextualizing the question by dealing, not with the 1961 UN Plebiscite, or the 1972 Unification, but rather the events of 1993 and 1994 on the constitutional demands vis-à-vis the claim for the right to self-determination of the Southern Cameroonian people. The Human Rights Commission stated that to invoke Self Determination as prescribed by Article 20 the African Charter, the Complainant must satisfy the Commission that the two conditions under Article 20(2), namely oppression and domination have been met. Based on events that occurred after December 18, 1989, the Human Rights Commission noted that the Complainants have not demonstrated if these conditions have been met to warrant invoking the right to self-determination. The Human Rights Commission also noted that in their submission, the Respondent State (Republic of Cameroun) implicitly accepted that self-determination may be exercisable by the Complainants on condition that they establish cases of massive violations of human rights or denial of participation in public affairs.

The Human Rights Commission noted that autonomy within a sovereign state is acceptable, in the context of self-government, confederacy, or federation while preserving the territorial integrity of a State party, can be exercised under the African Charter.

The Human Rights Commission recommended that the Respondent State (Republic of Cameroun) should among other things enter into constructive dialogue with the Complainants, and in particular SCNC and SCAPO, to resolve the constitutional issues, as well as grievances.

Bakassi Peninsula

Following the International Court of Justice ruling of 10 October 2002 that sovereignty over the Bakassi peninsula rested with Cameroon, SCAPO claimed that Bakassi was, in fact, part of the territory of Southern Cameroons. In 2002, SCAPO took the Nigerian government to the Federal High Court in Abuja to require it to take a case before the International Court of Justice to establish the right of the people of the Southern Cameroons to self-determination. The court ruled in their favour on 5 March 2002. On 14 August 2006 Nigeria handed over the Bakassi peninsula to Cameroon. SCAPO responded by proclaiming the independence of the Republic of Ambazonia, to include the territory of Bakassi.
 
Southern Cameroons, since then renamed to Ambazonia, is a member of the Unrepresented Nations and Peoples Organization (UNPO) since 2005 and a charter member of the Organization of Emerging African States (OEAS).

See also
 Ambazonia
 Anglophone Cameroonian
 Bakassi
 Biafra
States of Ambazonia

References

Sources and external links
SCNC official website
WorldStatesmen - Cameroon

 
Cameroons, Southern
History of Nigeria
History of Ambazonia
Cameroons, Southern
Cameroons, Southern
British Cameroon
Cameroons, Southern
Members of the Unrepresented Nations and Peoples Organization
1922 establishments in Africa
1961 disestablishments in Africa
English-speaking countries and territories